Olímpica de Engenho de Dentro Station is a railway station on the SuperVia network in Rio de Janeiro. The station services the Estádio Olímpico João Havelange.

References

SuperVia stations
Railway stations opened in 1873